Federico Barocci (also written Barozzi)(c. 1535 in Urbino – 1612 in Urbino) was an Italian Renaissance painter and printmaker.  His original name was Federico Fiori, and he was nicknamed Il Baroccio. His work was highly esteemed and influential, and  foreshadows the Baroque of Rubens. He is generally considered the greatest and the most individual painter of his time in central Italy.

Early life and training

He was born at Urbino, Duchy of Urbino, and received his earliest apprenticeship with his father, Ambrogio Barocci, a sculptor of some local eminence. He was then apprenticed with the painter Battista Franco in Urbino. He accompanied his uncle, Bartolomeo Genga to Pesaro, then in 1548 to Rome, where he was worked in the pre-eminent studio of the day, that of the Mannerist painters, Taddeo and Federico Zuccari.

Mature work in Rome and Urbino
After passing four years at Rome, he returned to his native city, where his first work of art was a St. Margaret executed for the Confraternity of the Holy Sacrament. He was invited back to Rome by Pope Pius IV to assist in the decoration of the Vatican Belvedere Palace at Rome, where he painted the Virgin Mary and infant, with several Saints and a ceiling in fresco, representing the Annunciation.

During this second sojourn, while completing the decorations for the Vatican, Barocci fell ill with intestinal complaints. He suspected that a salad which he had eaten had been poisoned by jealous rivals. Fearing his illness was terminal, he left Rome in 1563; four years later he was said to experience a partial remission after prayers to the Virgin. Barocci henceforth often complained of frail health, though he remained productive for nearly four decades more. While he is described by contemporaries as personally somewhat morose and hypochondriacal, his paintings are lively and brilliant. Although he continued to have major altarpiece commissions from afar, he never returned to Rome, and was mainly patronized in his native city by Francesco Maria II della Rovere, duke of Urbino. The Ducal Palace can be seen in the background of his paintings, rendered in a forced perspective that seems a holdover from Mannerism. 

While Barocci was removed from Rome, the fulcrum of artistic fame and influence, he continued to innovate in his style. At some point he may have seen colored chalk/pastel drawings by Correggio, but Barocci's remarkable pastel studies are the earliest examples of the technique to survive. In pastels and in oil sketches (another technique he pioneered) Barocci's soft, opalescent renderings evoke the ethereal. Such studies were part of a complex process Barocci used to complete his altarpieces. An organized series of steps leading up to the final product ensured its speed and success in execution. Barocci did innumerable sketches: gestural, compositional, figural studies (using models), lighting studies (using clay models), perspective studies, color studies, nature studies, etc. Today, over 2,000 drawings by him are extant. Every detail of his subsequent cartoons for canvases was worked out in this way. A good example is his famed Madonna del Popolo (Uffizi). It is a vortex of color and vitality, made possible by the great variety of people, poses, perspectives, natural details, colors, lighting and atmospheric effects. There are many surviving drawings for the Madonna del Popolo, from initial sketches to color studies of heads, to the final full size cartoon. Despite this painstaking process, Barocci's genius kept the brushstrokes passionate and liberated, and a spiritual light seems to flicker as a jewel across faces, hands, drapery, and sky.

Barocci's embrace of the Counter Reformation would shape his long and fruitful career. By 1566, he joined a lay order of Capuchins, an offshoot of Franciscans. He may have been influenced by Saint Philip Neri, whose Oratorians sought to reconnect the spiritual realm with the lives of everyday people. Neri, who was somewhat ambivalent about the accumulating richness of his Santa Maria in Vallicella, commissioned two completed works from Barocci, the pre-eminent artist of these large pious altarpieces:  The Visitation (1583-6) and Presentation of the Virgin (1593–94). Neri is said to have been moved to ecstasy by Barocci's accomplishment in the former painting, which shows the Virgin and Elizabeth greeting each other.

In Urbino, where he painted a Descent from the Cross for the cathedral of San Lorenzo at Perugia. He again visited Rome during the papacy of Gregory XIII when he painted two admirable pictures for the Chiesa Nuova, representing the Visitation of the Virgin Mary to Elisabeth and the  Presentation in the Temple, and for the Chiesa della Minerva, a Last Supper.

Critical assessment and legacy

The artist biographer Giovanni Bellori, the Baroque equivalent of Giorgio Vasari, considered Barocci to be among the finest painters of his time. Barocci's emotive brushwork was not lost on Peter Paul Rubens when he was in Italy. Rubens is known to have made a sketch of his dramatic Martyrdom of St Vitale, in which the martyr's undulating flesh is the eye of another whirlwind of figures, gestures, and drama. Also, Rubens' The Martyrdom of St Livinus seems to owe much to Barocci, from the putto with the pointing palm frond to the presence of dogs in the lower right corner. Among the painters and artists who worked under Barocci are Antonio Cimatori (Visacci), Ventura Mazza, Antonio Viviani (il Sordo di Urbino), Giovanni Andrea Urbani, Alessandro Vitali, and finally Felice and Vincenzo Pellegrini. Barocci also had many who followed or were strongly influenced by his style, including Nicolo Martinelli (il Trometta), Giovanni Battista Lombardelli, Domenico Malpiedi, Cesare & Basilio Maggeri, Filippo Bellini, Giovanni Laurentini (Arrigoni), Giorgio Picchi, Giovanni Giacomo Pandolfi, Pietro Paolo Tamburini, Terenzio d’Urbino (il Rondolino), Giulio Cesare Begni, Benedetto Marini, Girolamo Cialdieri, Giovanni Battista Urbinelli, Alfonso Patanazzi, Gian Ortensio Bertuzzi, Cesare Franchi (il Pollino), Silla Piccinini, Benedetto Bandiera, Matteuccio Salvucci, Simeone Ciburri, Pietro Rancanelli, Onofrio Marini, Alessandro Brunelli, and Francesco Baldelli.

Barocci's swirling composition and the focus on the emotional and spiritual are elements that foreshadow the Baroque of Rubens. But even in Federico's Proto-Baroque Beata Michelina can see the makings of Bernini's High Baroque masterpiece Ecstasy of St Theresa.

Partial List of Works

References

Sources

External links

 Cats in Barocci's Paintings.
 Prints & People: A Social History of Printed Pictures, an exhibition catalog from The Metropolitan Museum of Art (fully available online as PDF), which contains material on and by Federico Barocci (see index).
 Lisot, Elizabeth A. (2009). Passion, Penance and Mystical Union: Early Modern Catholic Polemics in the Religious Paintings of Federico Barocci, excerpt from Univ. of Texas, Dallas, Ph.D. Dissertation. See also: Elizabeth Lisot, Ph.D.
 
 
 The Creative Process Behind Federico Barocci's Drawings, on Google Arts and Culture.
 , engraved by Emma Smith for The Easter gift, 1832, with a poetical illustration by Letitia Elizabeth Landon

1528 births
1612 deaths
People from Urbino
16th-century Italian painters
Italian male painters
17th-century Italian painters
Italian Mannerist painters
Italian printmakers
Capuchins
Catholic engravers
Catholic painters